Basiothia aureata, the gold dotted temnora, is a moth of the family Sphingidae. It is found in wooded habitats from Liberia to Kenya in the east and to Angola, Zambia and Zimbabwe in the south.

The length of the forewings is 20–23 mm. The head and body are reddish brown and the abdomen is decorated with tiny golden dots. The forewings are reddish brown mottled with pinkish brown, particularly at the base, the apex and above the tornus. There are numerous oblique darker transverse lines. The hindwings are paler, with a dark brown margin. The females are sometimes darker.

The larvae feed on Impatiens species. They have a green head and body with a darker green dorsal line and traces of a darker subdorsal line with a few black specks in it. Pupations takes place in surface litter. The pupa has a pale bone colour with a greenish dorsal stripe on the abdomen and a series of subdorsal black dots.

References

Basiothia
Moths described in 1891
Moths of Africa